Gulara Gadirbeyova (1903-1942) was an Azerbaijani women's rights activist and politician (Communist).  

She was the chairperson of the Ali Bayramov Club, the organization of the Azerbaijani women's movement, in 1930-1937. 
She was also the chief editor of the women's magazin Azerbaijani Woman 1927-1937.

References

 Ziya Bünyadov. Qırmızı terror. Bakı: 1993.

1903 births
1942 deaths
20th-century Azerbaijani women politicians
20th-century Azerbaijani politicians
Azerbaijani feminists
20th-century Azerbaijani women writers
Azerbaijani journalists
Soviet women